is a baseball stadium in Sakai, Fukui, Japan.

As a stadium exclusively for baseball games, it is the largest in the Hokuriku region. The pitch size is 160 m × 95 m.  The main stand has 4,046 individual seats plus four handicapped seats, the back stand has 6,160 individual seats and the side stands have 10,833 seats bench seats. There is no roof over the stands.

Although designed for baseball, the stadium is also used for numerous soccer events.

Images

External links 

Football venues in Japan
Sports venues in Fukui Prefecture
Baseball venues in Japan
Sakai, Fukui
Sports venues completed in 1994
1994 establishments in Japan